Minas Antoniou (born 22 February 1994) is a Cypriot footballer who plays as a right wing-back for Cyprus First Division side Anorthosis Famagusta and the Cyprus national team.

Club career

Anorthosis Famagusta
On 29 June 2022, Antoniou signed with Cypriot First Division club Anorthosis Famagusta on a two-year contract until 2024.

International career
Anotoniou made his senior international debut on 23 March 2018 in a 0–0 friendly draw with Montenegro.

References

External links

1994 births
Living people
Cypriot footballers
Association football wingers
Association football defenders
Cyprus under-21 international footballers
Cyprus youth international footballers
Cyprus international footballers
AEL Limassol players
Nikos & Sokratis Erimis FC players
AEZ Zakakiou players
Aris Limassol FC players
APOEL FC players
Enosis Neon Paralimni FC players
Anorthosis Famagusta F.C. players
Cypriot First Division players